Hammock Dunes is a private golf community located in Palm Coast, Florida.  The gated neighborhood consists of luxury houses and condominia that have access to the Atlantic Ocean.

See also
St. Augustine, Florida
Daytona Beach, Florida

External links
 Hammock Dunes Official Site

Golf clubs and courses in Florida
Golf clubs and courses in Flagler County, Florida
Palm Coast, Florida